In probability theory and statistics, a covariance matrix (also known as auto-covariance matrix, dispersion matrix, variance matrix, or variance–covariance matrix) is a square matrix giving the covariance between each pair of elements of a given random vector. Any covariance matrix is symmetric and positive semi-definite and its main diagonal contains variances (i.e., the covariance of each element with itself).

Intuitively, the covariance matrix generalizes the notion of variance to multiple dimensions.

Definition

If the entries in the column vector

are random variables, each with finite variance and expected value, then the covariance matrix  is the matrix whose  entry is the covariance

where the operator  denotes the expected value (mean) of its argument.

Conflicting nomenclatures and notations
Nomenclatures differ. Some statisticians, following the probabilist William Feller in his two-volume book An Introduction to Probability Theory and Its Applications,  call the matrix  the variance of the random vector , because it is the natural generalization to higher dimensions of the 1-dimensional variance. Others call it the covariance matrix, because it is the matrix of covariances between the scalar components of the vector .

Both forms are quite standard, and there is no ambiguity between them. The matrix  is also often called the variance-covariance matrix, since the diagonal terms are in fact variances.

By comparison, the notation for the cross-covariance matrix between two vectors is

Properties

Relation to the autocorrelation matrix
The auto-covariance matrix  is related to the autocorrelation matrix  by

Relation to the correlation matrix

An entity closely related to the covariance matrix is the matrix of Pearson product-moment correlation coefficients between each of the random variables in the random vector , which can be written as

 

Each element on the principal diagonal of a correlation matrix is the correlation of a random variable with itself, which always equals 1. Each off-diagonal element is between −1 and +1 inclusive.

Inverse of the covariance matrix
The inverse of this matrix, if it exists, is the inverse covariance matrix (or inverse concentration matrix), also known as the precision matrix (or concentration matrix).

Just as the covariance matrix can be written as the rescaling of a correlation matrix by the marginal variances: 

So, using the idea of partial correlation, and partial variance, the inverse covariance matrix can be expressed analogously:

This duality motivates a number of other dualities between marginalizing and conditioning for gaussian random variables.

Basic properties
 
  is positive-semidefinite, i.e. 
  is symmetric, i.e. 
 For any constant (i.e. non-random)  matrix  and constant  vector , one has 

Block matrices 

then the conditional distribution for  given  is given by

defined by conditional mean

and conditional variance

The matrix of regression coefficients may often be given in transpose form, suitable for post-multiplying a row vector of explanatory variables  rather than pre-multiplying a column vector . In this form they correspond to the coefficients obtained by inverting the matrix of the normal equations of ordinary least squares (OLS).

Partial covariance matrix 
A covariance matrix with all non-zero elements tells us that all the individual random variables are interrelated. This means that the variables are not only directly correlated, but also correlated via other variables indirectly. Often such indirect, common-mode correlations are trivial and uninteresting. They can be suppressed by calculating the partial covariance matrix, that is the part of covariance matrix that shows only the interesting part of correlations.

The partial covariance matrix  is effectively the simple covariance matrix  as if the uninteresting random variables  were held constant.

Covariance matrix as a parameter of a distribution
If a column vector  of  possibly correlated random variables is jointly normally distributed, or more generally elliptically distributed, then its probability density function  can be expressed in terms of the covariance matrix  as follows

Covariance matrix as a linear operator

Applied to one vector, the covariance matrix maps a linear combination c of the random variables X onto a vector of covariances with those variables: . Treated as a bilinear form, it yields the covariance between the two linear combinations: . The variance of a linear combination is then , its covariance with itself.

Similarly, the (pseudo-)inverse covariance matrix provides an inner product , which induces the Mahalanobis distance, a measure of the "unlikelihood" of c.

Which matrices are covariance matrices?
From the identity just above, let  be a  real-valued vector, then

which must always be nonnegative, since it is the variance of a real-valued random variable, so a covariance matrix is always a positive-semidefinite matrix.

The above argument can be expanded as follows:where the last inequality follows from the observation that  is a scalar.

Conversely, every symmetric positive semi-definite matrix is a covariance matrix. To see this, suppose  is a  symmetric positive-semidefinite matrix. From the finite-dimensional case of the spectral theorem, it follows that  has a nonnegative symmetric square root, which can be denoted by M1/2. Let  be any  column vector-valued random variable whose covariance matrix is the  identity matrix. Then

Complex random vectors

The variance of a complex scalar-valued random variable with expected value  is conventionally defined using complex conjugation:

where the complex conjugate of a complex number  is denoted ; thus the variance of a complex random variable is a real number.

If  is a column vector of complex-valued random variables, then the conjugate transpose  is formed by both transposing and conjugating. In the following expression, the product of a vector with its conjugate transpose results in a square matrix called the covariance matrix, as its expectation:

,

The matrix so obtained will be Hermitian positive-semidefinite, with real numbers in the main diagonal and complex numbers off-diagonal.

Properties
 The covariance matrix is a Hermitian matrix, i.e. .
 The diagonal elements of the covariance matrix are real.

Pseudo-covariance matrix
For complex random vectors, another kind of second central moment, the pseudo-covariance matrix (also called relation matrix) is defined as follows:

In contrast to the covariance matrix defined above, Hermitian transposition gets replaced by transposition in the definition.
Its diagonal elements may be complex valued; it is a complex symmetric matrix.

Estimation

or, if the row means were known a priori,

These empirical sample covariance matrices are the most straightforward and most often used estimators for the covariance matrices, but other estimators also exist, including regularised or shrinkage estimators, which may have better properties.

Applications
The covariance matrix is a useful tool in many different areas. From it a transformation matrix can be derived, called a whitening transformation, that allows one to completely decorrelate the data or, from a different point of view, to find an optimal basis for representing the data in a compact way (see Rayleigh quotient for a formal proof and additional properties of covariance matrices).
This is called principal component analysis (PCA) and the Karhunen–Loève transform (KL-transform).

The covariance matrix plays a key role in financial economics, especially in portfolio theory and its mutual fund separation theorem and in the capital asset pricing model. The matrix of covariances among various assets' returns is used to determine, under certain assumptions, the relative amounts of different assets that investors should (in a normative analysis) or are predicted to (in a positive analysis) choose to hold in a context of diversification.

Use in optimization
The evolution strategy, a particular family of Randomized Search Heuristics, fundamentally relies on a covariance matrix in its mechanism. The characteristic mutation operator draws the update step from a multivariate normal distribution using an evolving covariance matrix. There is a formal proof that the evolution strategy's covariance matrix adapts to the inverse of the Hessian matrix of the search landscape, up to a scalar factor and small random fluctuations (proven for a single-parent strategy and a static model, as the population size increases, relying on the quadratic approximation). 
Intuitively, this result is supported by the rationale that the optimal covariance distribution can offer mutation steps whose equidensity probability contours match the level sets of the landscape, and so they maximize the progress rate.

Covariance mapping
Statistically independent regions of the functions show up on the map as zero-level flatland, while positive or negative correlations show up, respectively, as hills or valleys.

 
where  is the i-th discrete value in sample j of the random function . The expected values needed in the covariance formula are estimated using the sample mean, e.g.

and the covariance matrix is estimated by the sample covariance matrix

where the angular brackets denote sample averaging as before except that the Bessel's correction should be made to avoid bias. Using this estimation the partial covariance matrix can be calculated as

where the backslash denotes the left matrix division operator, which bypasses the requirement to invert a matrix and is available in some computational packages such as Matlab.

Fig. 1 illustrates how a partial covariance map is constructed on an example of an experiment performed at the FLASH free-electron laser in Hamburg. The random function  is the time-of-flight spectrum of ions from a Coulomb explosion of nitrogen molecules multiply ionised by a laser pulse. Since only a few hundreds of molecules are ionised at each laser pulse, the single-shot spectra are highly fluctuating. However, collecting typically  such spectra, and averaging them over  produces a smooth spectrum , which is shown in red at the bottom of Fig. 1. The average spectrum  reveals several nitrogen ions in a form of peaks broadened by their kinetic energy, but to find the correlations between the ionisation stages and the ion momenta requires calculating a covariance map.

Unfortunately, this map is overwhelmed by uninteresting, common-mode correlations induced by laser intensity fluctuating from shot to shot. The suppression of the uninteresting correlations is, however, imperfect because there are other sources of common-mode fluctuations than the laser intensity and in principle all these sources should be monitored in vector . Yet in practice it is often sufficient to overcompensate the partial covariance correction as panel f shows, where interesting correlations of ion momenta are now clearly visible as straight lines centred on ionisation stages of atomic nitrogen.

Two-dimensional infrared spectroscopy
Two-dimensional infrared spectroscopy employs correlation analysis to obtain 2D spectra of the condensed phase. There are two versions of this analysis: synchronous and asynchronous. Mathematically, the former is expressed in terms of the sample covariance matrix and the technique is equivalent to covariance mapping.

See also
 Covariance function
 Multivariate statistics
 Lewandowski-Kurowicka-Joe distribution
 Gramian matrix
 Eigenvalue decomposition
 Quadratic form (statistics)
 Principal components

References

Further reading
 
 "Covariance Matrix Explained With Pictures", an easy way to visualize covariance matrices!
 
 

Covariance and correlation
Matrices
Summary statistics